Finnish-Hungarian relations are foreign relations between Finland and Hungary. Both countries are members of the European Union, Council of Europe and the Organization for Security and Co-operation in Europe. Both people’s language are part of the Uralic language family.

History

Before independence 
At the end of the 19th century the Finno-Ugric linguistic affinity became widely accepted after extensive public debate.

Independence 
Hungary recognized Finland on August 23, 1920. Finland recognised Hungary on September 10, 1920.

World War II 
 

When the Winter War broke out between Finland and the Soviet Union, many Hungarians felt great sympathy towards the Finns and wanted to help them.

The Hungarian government officially did not support Finland, but secretly started searching for ways of helping. In addition, non-governmental organisations began to organize support for Finland. Hungary helped Finland by giving monetary donations, armaments and military volunteers.

After the loss of Continuation War, Finland discontinued diplomatic relations on September 20, 1944.

Post World War II 

Diplomatic relations were re-established on May 20, 1947. Finland has an embassy in Budapest and an honorary consulate in Pécs.  Hungary has an embassy in Helsinki and 4 honorary consulates (in Turku, Mariehamn, Tampere and Joensuu). Both countries are full members of the European Union.

See also  
 Foreign relations of Finland
 Foreign relations of Hungary
 Hungarians in Finland

References

External links 
  Finish Ministry of Foreign Affairs about relations with Hungary
  Hungarian embassy in Helsinki 

 

 
Hungary 
Bilateral relations of Hungary